The Riversdale Cup is the second oldest amateur golf tournament in Australia. It is a Golf Australia national ranking event. The event has been played since 1896 and is organised by and played at the Riversdale Golf Club in Mount Waverley, Victoria. It was known as the Surrey Hills Gentlemen's Championship, Gold Medal from 1896 to 1907, the Riversdale Trophy from 1909 to 1926, and the Riversdale Cup since 1928. The men's event has been played as a 72-hole stroke play tournament since 1958 when Kevin Hartley won for the first time. The All Abilities Riversdale Cup commenced in 2020.

Men's winners
Source: 

2022 Max Ford
2021 Andrew Richards
2020 Lawrence Curtis
2019 Chris Crabtree
2018 Jack Thompson
2017 Dylan Perry
2016 Harrison Endycott
2015 Travis Smyth
2014 Ryan Ruffels
2013 Brady Watt
2012 Jake Higginbottom
2011 Nathan Holman
2010 Jin Jeong
2009 Jordan Sherratt
2008 Scott Arnold
2007 Tim Stewart
2006 Steve Dartnell
2005 Mathew Holten
2004 Michael Sim
2003 Kurt Barnes
2002 Richard Moir
2001 Shannon Jones
2000 Andrew Webster
1999 Aaron Baddeley
1998 Brendan Jones
1997 James McLean
1996 Jarrod Moseley
1995 Lee Eagleton
1994 Lester Peterson
1993 Jason Dawes
1992 Lester Peterson
1991 Robert Allenby
1990 Robert Allenby
1989 Paul Moloney
1988 David Ecob
1987 Stephen Taylor
1986 Michael Sammels
1985 Stephen Taylor
1984 Chris Longley
1983 John Lindsay
1982 Trevor Henley
1981 Mike Clayton
1980 Geoff Sowden
1979 Eric Routley
1978 Kevin Hartley
1977 Kevin Hartley
1976 Kevin Hartley
1975 Trevor Henley
1974 Bill Britten
1973 Alan Reiter
1972 Neil Titheridge
1971 Kevin Hartley
1970 Randall Hicks
1969 Bill Britten
1968 Kevin Hartley
1967 Kevin Hartley
1966 Bill Britten
1965 Kevin Hartley
1964 Kevin Hartley
1963 Kevin Hartley
1962 Tom Crow
1961 Tom Crow
1960 John Hood
1959 Bob Bull
1958 Kevin Hartley
1957 Barry West
1956 Peter Crow
1955 Alex Rae
1954 D B Kendler
1953 F T Kennett
1952 Laurie Duffy
1951 D Cade
1950 David Doughton
1949 A P Launder
1948 Bill Higgins
1947 Bill Higgins
1946 Laurie Duffy
1939–45 No tournament
1938 Alex Rae
1937 Bill Higgins
1936 Bill Edgar
1935 Mick Ryan
1934 Harry Williams
1933 Mick Ryan
1932 Harry Williams
1931 Alex Russell
1930 Harry Williams
1929 Alex Russell
1928 Fred Lemann
1927 No tournament
1926 Ivo Whitton
1925 Ivo Whitton
1924 Bruce Pearce
1923 Abe Schlapp
1922 Bruce Pearce
1921 Bruce Pearce
1920 George Fawcett
1919 Gus Jackson
1915–18 No tournament
1914 Frank Murdoch
1913 Ivo Whitton
1912 Ivo Whitton
1911 Audley Lemprière
1910 Frank Murdoch
1909 George Morrison
1908 No tournament
1907 Frank Murdoch
1906 Hector Morrison
1905 Michael Scott
1904 Leslie Penfold Hyland
1903 Louis Whyte
1902 P. C. Anderson
1901 William McIntyre
1900 Harry Howden
1899 P. C. Anderson
1898 P. C. Anderson
1897 Thomas Huggins
1896 Mark Anderson

Women's winners
This list is incomplete

2022 Abbie Teasdale
2021 Jeneath Wong
2020 Jeneath Wong
2019 Yuna Nishimura
2018 Rebecca Kay
2017 Karis Davidson
2016 Kirsty Hodgkins
2015 Munchin Keh
2014 Shelly Shin
2013 Grace Lennon
2012 Whitney Hillier
2011 Cecilia Cho
2010 Jessica Speechley
2009 Ashlee Dewhurst
2008 Julia Boland
2007 Inhong Lim
2006 Inhong Lim
2005 Nicki Garrett
2004 Dana Lacey
2003 Sarah Kemp

All-Abilities winners
Source: 

2022 Mike Brown
2021 Warren Sutton
2020 Warren Sutton

References

External links
Riversdale Golf Club

Amateur golf tournaments in Australia
Golf in Victoria (Australia)
Recurring sporting events established in 1896